Sarcotrochila is a genus of fungi in the family Hemiphacidiaceae. The genus contains four species.

References

External links
Sarcotrochila at Index Fungorum

Helotiales